Xiao Luxi (born 19 July 1982) is a Singaporean former badminton player.

Early life 
In 1997, she came from China as a 14-year-old, and together with Li Li, Frances Liu and Rong Muxi, were Singapore badminton's pioneer batch of foreign talent.

Career 
Xiao was the first of the quartet to make a mark internationally, partnering Liu Zhen to victory at the 2001 Hong Kong Open. That was Singapore's first win on the Grand Prix circuit, and the duo once climbed as high as 11th in the world. Her best result in singles was third place at the 2002 Asian Badminton Championships, when she scalped China's then-world No 20 Hu Ting. In 2003, she won Singapore first ever women's badminton team gold at the 2003 Southeast Asian Games that was held in Vietnam's Ho Chi Minh City. 

She quit the national team in 2004 and returned to Fujian Province, China.

Achievements

Asian Championships 
Women's doubles

Southeast Asian Games 
Women's doubles

IBF Grand Prix 
The World Badminton Grand Prix was sanctioned by the International Badminton Federation from 1983 to 2006.

Women's doubles

IBF International 
Women's singles

References

External links 
 

1982 births
Living people
Badminton players from Fujian
Chinese emigrants to Singapore
Singaporean sportspeople of Chinese descent
Naturalised citizens of Singapore
Singaporean female badminton players
Competitors at the 2003 Southeast Asian Games
Southeast Asian Games gold medalists for Singapore
Southeast Asian Games bronze medalists for Singapore
Southeast Asian Games medalists in badminton
21st-century Singaporean women